James Denton (born 1963) is an American actor.

James Denton may also refer to:

James S. Denton (1951–2018), American publisher and editor
James Samuel Denton (1875–1963), Australian army officer and politician
James G. Denton (1917–1982), Justice of the Supreme Court of Texas
James Denton (priest), English priest